Hollin Hall may refer to:

 Hollin Hall (Virginia), United States
Hollin Old Hall, Cheshire, England
Hollin Hall, Cumbria, Crook, Cumbria, England
Hollin Hall, North Yorkshire, England